Edmonton-Beverly-Clareview is a provincial electoral district for the Legislative Assembly of Alberta, Canada. The electoral district covers the neighbourhoods of Beverly, Belmont Park and Clareview Town Centre. It was created in 1996, and was first contested in the 1997 election. It was last contested in the 2019 election, and has been held by Deron Bilous of the NDP since 2012.

History
The electoral district was created in the 1996 boundary redistribution from the old electoral district of Edmonton-Beverly-Belmont. In the 2010 boundary redistribution the riding boundaries were extended north into Edmonton-Manning from 137 Avenue to 144 Avenue while the south boundaries were extended to take a large portion from Edmonton-Highlands-Norwood.

Boundary history

Electoral history overview

The electoral district of Edmonton-Beverly-Clareview was created in the 1997 general election from most of the electoral district of Edmonton-Beverly-Belmont. The district has been somewhat of a swing riding since its creation with the Liberals, New Democrats and Progressive Conservatives all holding a sizable base in the district. While the Liberals have received high numbers of votes, only the Progressive Conservatives and New Democrats have returned MLAs from the riding.

The first Member for the riding was incumbent Julius Yankowsky, who had crossed the floor to the Progressive Conservatives from the Liberals. He won the new district in a close three-way race. He won his third term in the 2001 election with a higher margin of victory.

Despite having three terms of incumbency, Yankowsky was unable to win a third term in office. He faced former New Democratic Party leader Ray Martin, who defeated him taking just over half the popular vote in the district.

Martin held until the 2008 election, after which Edmonton-Manning MLA Tony Vandermeer defeated Martin in a closely contested race. Vandermeer was defeated by New Democrat Deron Bilous in the 2012 provincial election, who was re-elected in the 2015 provincial election with a majority of 9,525 and 73.8% of the popular vote.

Legislature results

1997 general election

2001 general election

2004 general election

2008 general election

2012 general election

2015 general election

2019 general election

Senate nominee results

2004 Senate nominee election district results

Voters had the option of selecting 4 Candidates on the Ballot

2012 Senate nominee election district results

Student Vote results

2004 student election

On November 19, 2004 a Student Vote was conducted at participating Alberta schools to parallel the 2004 Alberta general election results. The vote was designed to educate students and simulate the electoral process for persons who have not yet reached the legal majority. The vote was conducted in 80 of the 83 provincial electoral districts with students voting for actual election candidates. Schools with a large student body that reside in another electoral district had the option to vote for candidates outside of the electoral district then where they were physically located.

2012 student election

References

External links
The Legislative Assembly of Alberta
Map of electoral district

Alberta provincial electoral districts
Politics of Edmonton